Władysław Andrzej Serczyk (1935-2014) was a Polish historian-Ukrainist. Born in Krakow, he after graduating Jagiellonian University stayed in the university and began his scientific career. In 1963, he received his doctorate and in 1968 Serczyk received his habilitation. Since 1976 he was a professor. In 1974-1978, Serczyk was a director of Jagiellonian Library. In 1986-1996, he headed a branch of University of Warsaw in Bialystok, Institute of History of Eastern Europe (today University of Białystok).

Publications
Gospodarstwo magnackie w województwie podolskim w drugiej poł. XVIII wieku (1965)
Koliszczyzna (1968)
Lenin w Krakowie i na Podhalu (1970)
Hajdamacy (1972, 1978)
Piotr Wielki (1973, 1977, 1990, 2003)
Katarzyna II carowa Rosji (1974, 1983, 1989, 1995, 2004)
Iwan IV Groźny (1977, 1986, 1993, 2004)
Wielka Socjalistyczna Rewolucja Październikowa. Zarys historyczny (1977)
Historia Ukrainy (1979, 1990, 2001, 2009)
Związek Radziecki w latach 1921-1925 (1980)
Połtawa 1709 (1982, 2004)
Kultura rosyjska XVIII wieku (1984)
Na dalekiej Ukrainie. Dzieje Kozaczyzny do 1648 roku (1984, 1986, 2008, 2016)
Kijów (1986)
Poczet władców Rosji. Romanowowie (1992)
Początek końca: konfederacja barska i I rozbiór Polski (1997)
Na płonącej Ukrainie. Dzieje Kozaczyzny 1648-1651 (1998, 1999, 2007, 2009, 2016)

External links
 Chornovol, I. ''Vladyslav Serchyk. Encyclopedia of History of Ukraine.

1935 births
2014 deaths
Academic staff of Jagiellonian University
Jagiellonian University alumni
Academic staff of Chernivtsi University
Academic staff of Ukrainian Free University
Ukrainianists
Members of the Polish Academy of Sciences
Recipient of the Meritorious Activist of Culture badge